The Route of the Franciscan Evangelisation in Guatemala can be found in central and western Guatemala.

Site description
There exist 26 Franciscan churches and other religious structures along this route that stretches from the east through the central and western portions of this Central American country.

World Heritage Status
This site was added to the UNESCO World Heritage Tentative List on September 23, 2002, in the Cultural category.

See also
Route of the Dominican Evangelisation of Guatemala
Evangelisation
Missionary

Notes

References
 Route of the Franciscan Evangelisation - UNESCO World Heritage Centre Retrieved 2009-03-04.

Guatemalan culture